Deaf Sam-yong may refer to:

 Deaf Sam-yong (1929 film), Korean film
 Deaf Sam-yong (1964 film), Korean film